Robert Crichton is a supporting character in various media based on DC Comics series.  He is typically established as the warden of a prison or mental hospital.

Crichton appeared Warden of Gotham Prison in several episodes of the 1960s Batman series played by David Lewis.  One such episode is "Fine Feathered Finks" (1966). Much like Commissioner Gordon and Chief O'Hara, he was depicted as a well-intentioned official, if somewhat dependent on Batman.

Crichton was not seen in Batman: The Animated Series but a document seen in the episode Double Talk mentioned him as the warden of Arkham Asylum.

He has also been established in some adaptations as the warden of Belle Reve.

Warden Crichton appears in Batman '66 as the warden of Gotham Penitentiary. In contrast to the original depiction of the character, this version of Warden Crichton is an African-American woman.

References

DC Comics male characters
Fictional prison officers and governors